Thornburg is an unincorporated community in Smith County, Kansas, United States.

History
Thornburg briefly had a post office, from 1902 until 1904. Thornburg School, a one-room schoolhouse, was built in 1880 and remained in use until its closing in 1963.  The original structure still stands.

References

Further reading

External links
 Smith County maps: Current, Historic, KDOT

Unincorporated communities in Smith County, Kansas
Unincorporated communities in Kansas